The Élorn is a  long river in Brittany, France.

The maritime part of the river stops at Landerneau, where the Pont de Rohan blocks seaborne ships from sailing any further upstream. The river also crosses the château de la Roche-Maurice and many abandoned mills, and on the banks of its maritime part are several family properties belonging to families in Brest (Park an Coat, le Frout, Beau Repos, le Petit Manoir de Poul ar Velin). At low tide the mud is met, at high tide the sea flows over the countryside.

References

0Elorn
Geography of Brest, France
Rivers of France
Rivers of Brittany
Rivers of Finistère